Rodrigo Corrêa Dantas (born October 20, 1989 in Rio de Janeiro) is a Brazilian footballer, who currently plays for Casa Pia.

Career
The attacking midfielder began his career with Botafogo, later played on loan for Portuguesa-RJ and América-RN. In March 2011, he joined Swedish club Västerås SK Fotboll on a loan deal lasting until 31 May 2011.

Honors
 Botafogo
Taça Rio: 2007, 2008
Taça Guanabara: 2009

References

External links

1989 births
Living people
Brazilian footballers
Brazilian expatriate footballers
Primeira Liga players
Liga Portugal 2 players
Campeonato de Portugal (league) players
Botafogo de Futebol e Regatas players
Associação Atlética Portuguesa (RJ) players
América Futebol Clube (RN) players
Västerås SK Fotboll players
C.F. Os Belenenses players
Varzim S.C. players
C.D. Fátima players
Esporte Clube São Bento players
Maringá Futebol Clube players
Macaé Esporte Futebol Clube players
Tupi Football Club players
Madureira Esporte Clube players
Casa Pia A.C. players
Brazilian expatriate sportspeople in Sweden
Brazilian expatriate sportspeople in Portugal
Expatriate footballers in Sweden
Expatriate footballers in Portugal
Association football midfielders
Footballers from Rio de Janeiro (city)